Rautakantele is a 1995 album by the Finnish rock group CMX. "Rautakantele" is Finnish and means "The Iron Kantele".

Track listing
All songs by CMX with lyrics by A. W. Yrjänä.

 "Rautakantele" – 4:31 ("Iron Kantele")
 "Yöllisiä" – 3:18 ("Nocturnals") 
 "Palvonnan eleitä" – 3:03 ("Gestures of Worship")
 "Talviunia" – 3:29 ("Winterdreams")
 "Kirosäkeet" – 4:10 ("Curse Verses")
 "Ennustaja" – 3:54 ("Fortune Teller")
 "Päivälintu" – 3:48 ("Daybird")
 "G" – 3:37 
 "Pelasta maailma" – 4:15 ("Save the World")
 "Linnunhammas" – 3:18 ("Bird's Tooth")
 "Veden ääri" – 3:06 ("Water's Edge")
 "Pirunmaitoa" – 6:09 ("Devil's Milk")
 "Hiljaisuuteen" – 2:04  ("Into Silence")

Personnel
 A. W. Yrjänä - vocals, bass
 Janne Halmkrona - guitars
 Timo Rasio - guitars
 Pekka Kanniainen - drums

Guests
 Ilkka Herkman - Engineer
 Dan Tigersted - Mixing
 Tuula Lehtinen - Sleeve art/design
 Timo Lehtinen - Photography
 Petri Artturi Asikainen - Photography
 Tuula Penttinen - Sleeve art/design
 Mara Salminen - keyboards, vocals
 Susanna Eronen - vocals
 Satu Sopanen - kantele
 Risto Salmi - soprano saxophone
 Kikke Heikkinen - vocals
 Kaarina Kilpiö - percussion
 Keijo Puumalainen - percussion
 Ville Leppänen - slide guitar
 Kampin Laulu - choir

References

1995 albums
CMX (band) albums